The Northside Festival is an annual week-long summer showcase celebrating emerging "music, innovation and art" in Brooklyn, New York, United States. The festival is held at venues across the neighborhoods of Williamsburg, Greenpoint and Bushwick and is organized by Northside Media Group, the publishers of The L Magazine, Brooklyn Magazine, Playwright's Horizon and BAMbill.

History 
Northside was started in 2009 by Brooklyn's Northside Media Group, which published the L Magazine and Brooklyn Magazine.

The festival is a showcase of Brooklyn's recent cultural renaissance. Every June for the past decade, Northside has brought hundreds of bands, artists and speakers to the festival. Past performers include Guided By Voices, Solange, Brian Wilson, Miguel, Dirty Projectors, Beirut, Girlpool and more. Past speakers include Mayor Bill de Blasio, Senator Kirsten Gillibrand, SNL's Sasheer Zamata, hotelier Ian Schrager, writer Piper Kerman and Kickstarter CEO Yancey Stickler.

References

Arts festivals in the United States
Festivals in New York City
Culture of Brooklyn
Music festivals established in 2009
2009 establishments in New York City